Luke Stephen Clark (born 24 May 1994) is an English footballer who plays as a right back or as a central midfielder for Marine.

Career
Before joining Preston North End, Clark was with Everton. His first appearance for Preston was on 7 November 2011 in the EFL Trophy against Rochdale, having a shot narrowly going wide, then scoring the winning penalty in a penalty shoot-out, which Preston won 4–2. Clark made his first team debut against Rochdale at Deepdale on 19 November 2011. On 28 May 2012, Preston announced that Clark had turned down their offer of a professional contract, and that he was subsequently a free agent.

On 5 July 2012 it was announced Clark has joined League Two side Accrington Stanley on a two-year contract.

On 21 November 2014 it was announced that Clark had joined Witton Albion.

In July 2015 he joined Salford City.

In September 2016 he joined Curzon Ashton He left the club in summer 2018 after accepting a job offer in London.

He joined Chester in summer 2020 on a short-term deal.

He joined Marine in March 2022.

References

External links
 

1994 births
Living people
English footballers
Association football defenders
Preston North End F.C. players
Braintree Town F.C. players
Accrington Stanley F.C. players
Witton Albion F.C. players
Salford City F.C. players
Curzon Ashton F.C. players
Chester F.C. players
English Football League players
National League (English football) players
Northern Premier League players
Marine F.C. players